Willy Rath (1872–1940) was a German screenwriter, mainly of the silent era. He was also a successful writer for cabaret.

Selected filmography
 Countess Walewska (1920)
 In Thrall to the Claw (1921)
 The Love Corridor (1921)
 Hannele's Journey to Heaven (1922)
 Don Juan (1922)
 Alone in the Jungle (1922)
 William Tell (1923)
 The Treasure of Gesine Jacobsen (1923)
 Love Is the Power of Women (1924)
 The Radio Marriage (1924)
 Battle of the Butterflies (1924)
 Harry Hill's Deadly Hunt (1925)
 Struggle for the Soil (1925)
 Neptune Bewitched (1925)
 The Girl from America (1925)
 Wrath of the Seas (1926)
 Sword and Shield (1926)
 The Lorelei (1927)
 A Day of Roses in August (1927)
 U-9 Weddigen (1927)
 I Once Had a Beautiful Homeland (1928)
 Hubertus Castle (1934)

References

Bibliography
 Peter Jelavich. Munich and Theatrical Modernism: Politics, Playwriting, and Performance, 1890-1914. Harvard University Press, 1985.

External links

1872 births
1940 deaths
German male screenwriters
People from Wiesbaden
Film people from Hesse
20th-century German screenwriters